Sinchon-dong (신촌동, 新村洞) is neighborhood of Dongan district in the city of Anyang, Gyeonggi Province, South Korea.

External links
 Sinchon-dong 

Dongan-gu
Neighbourhoods in Anyang, Gyeonggi